Lusk is a surname. Notable people with the name include:

 Andrew Lusk (1810–1909), a Scottish businessman and liberal politician
 Anna Hartwell Lusk (1870–1968), American socialite 
 Bob Lusk (born 1932), American football player
 Clayton R. Lusk (1872–1959), American politician from New York State
 Clyde T. Lusk (1932–2014), U.S. Coast Guard admiral
 Damon Lusk (born 1977), American stockcar racer
 Daniel Lusk born 1938), American poet and writer
 Don Lusk (1913–2018), American animator and director
 Doris Lusk, 1916–1990), New Zealand artist
 Gene Lusk (1920–1969), American politician
 George Lusk (1839–1919), British chair of the Whitechapel Vigilance Committee
 Georgia Lee Lusk (1893–1971), American first female U.S. Congressional representative from New Mexico
 Hall S. Lusk (1883–1983), an American jurist
 Harold Lusk (1877–1961), New Zealand cricketer
 Henry Lusk (born 1972), American football player
 Herb Lusk (1953–2022), American football player
 Hugh Lusk (1837–1926), New Zealand politician
 Hugh Lusk (cricketer) (1866–1944), New Zealand cricketer and lawyer
 Janet Lusk (1924–1994), Scottish social worker
 Jayson Lusk (born 1974), American economist
 Jeremy Lusk, an American freestyle motocross racer
 Kaitlyn Lusk, American singer
 Marie Koupal Lusk (1962–1929), American painter
 Nancy Lusk (born 1953), American politician
 Newell Lusk (1875–1956), New Zealand cricketer
 Rich Lusk, American theologian and minister
 Robert Martin Lusk (1851–1913), American politician and judge
 Paul Lusk (born 1971), American baseball head coach
 Professor Eddie Lusk (1948–1992), American Chicago blues musician
 Robert Lusk (1781–1845), a presbyterian minister
 Stanislav Lusk (1931–1987), Czech rower
 William Thompson Lusk (1838–1897), American obstetrician and soldier